The 2015 Knurów riots was the biggest unrest among ultras and football fans in Poland since the Słupsk street riots 1998, in protest at the killing of Dawid Dziedzic, a fan at lower league football match by police. Although the rioting has ceased tensions remain high and fans from around the globe have continued to publicly condemn the actions of the police.

History
On 2 May 2015, at a Concordia Knurów versus Ruch Radzionków fifth division match in Knurów, police started firing rubber bullets at fans from a close distance after several home fans jumped onto the pitch and ran towards the visiting fans.

A 27-year-old fan of Concordia, Dawid Dziedzic, was shot, and despite attempts to resuscitate him he died shortly in hospital hours later. He was a single father, described as a caring parent from a modest background.

According to the police, the use of such force was justified, whilst the fans said that such a minor infringement of pitch invasion should never be punished by death. Under Polish law, unauthorised entering onto the pitch during a football match is punishable by up to three years in prison. The police reaction has sparked anger among fans, particularly the ultras, with the appeal for support reaching an international appeal. A full court investigation has launched into the incident.

In Knurów around 200 fans have clashed with police outside the police headquarters, with the riots lasting several days. 46 people were arrested, many injured fans as well as policemen.

Thousands of people attended Dawid's funeral on 7 May 2015. Fans lit flares during the ceremony, and the ceremony was conducted in a peaceful manner. The gathering was marked by heavy police presence.

See also
Football hooliganism in Poland
Police brutality
1998 Słupsk street riots

References

2015 riots
Riots and civil disorder in Poland
2015 in Poland
Protests in Poland
Protests in the European Union
2015 protests
Knurów
Association football riots
Association football hooliganism
Police brutality in Europe
2015 crimes in Poland
Police brutality in the 2010s